The Grail Quest is a  historical fiction novel series written by Bernard Cornwell dealing with a 14th-century search for the Holy Grail, around the time of the Hundred Years' War.  The stories follow the adventures of the fictional Thomas of Hookton as he leaves Dorset after the murder of his father and joins the English Army under Edward III as an archer. In Harlequin he is involved in battle in Brittany and subsequently at the Battle of Crécy. The archers are the first soldiers to be deployed along the crest of the hill at Crécy, providing cover before the battle starts for the knights building a system of ditches, pits and caltrops below to maim and bring down the enemy cavalry. The battle is a decisive victory for the English, even though they were outnumbered.

It is after this battle that Thomas' family's links to the Grail come to the attention of the King and in Vagabond he is sent back to England to discover its whereabouts and becomes involved in the Scottish invasion of 1347.  He soon discovers that his cousin, Guy Vexille, is working with powerful figures within the Catholic Church in France to discover the Grail for their own ends. The novel ends with fierce fighting at La Roche-Derrien back in Brittany.

Heretic finds Thomas still in France, this time during a time of supposed peace with the French following the fall of Calais.  Thomas leads a small band of men into southern France to find the Grail. He becomes the centre of a bitter local war with those also seeking the Grail as well as by the Black Death.

Books
Harlequin (2000, published in the United States under the title The Archer's Tale)
Vagabond (2002)
Heretic (2003)
1356 (2012)

Aftermath
Thomas of Hookton is later briefly mentioned in Cornwell's novel Azincourt, set around the events leading up to the Battle of Agincourt in 1415 as having "died as a lord of a thousand acres."

See also
Saint Guinefort

References

Book series introduced in 2000
Novels about the Black Death
Novels set in the 14th century
-
Hundred Years' War literature